Francis Joseph Christian (born 1942) is an American prelate of the Roman Catholic Church who served as an auxiliary bishop of the Diocese of Manchester in New Hampshire from 1996 to 2018.

Biography

Early life 
Christian was born on born October 8, 1942, in Peterborough, New Hampshire. He attended primary school in the Jaffrey-Rindge Cooperative School District, graduating from Conant High School in Jaffrey, New Hampshire.

Christian studied at Saint Anselm College in Goffstown, New Hampshire, for two years before entering Saint Paul Seminary in Ottawa, Ontario, in 1962.  In 1964, he graduated from Saint Paul with a Bachelor of Arts degree.  He received a Bachelor of Philosophy degree from the University of Ottawa in 1964.

Priesthood 
On June 28, 1968, Christian was ordained into the priesthood for the Diocese of Manchester by Bishop Ernest Primeau at Saint Patrick Church in Jaffrey.

After his ordination, Christian served three years as parochial vicar at Our Lady of Mercy Parish in Merrimack, New Hampshire, then a year with the same position at Saint Joseph Cathedral Parish. In 1975, Christian entered the American College at the University of Louvain in Belgium, earning a Master of Theology degree in 1975.

In March 1975, Christian returned to Manchester to be assistant chancellor of the Diocese of Manchester.  He was promoted to chancellor in June 1977. In 1986, Pope John Paul II named Christian a prelate of honor, which includes the title "monsignor,".

Auxiliary Bishop of Manchester 
On April 2, 1996, Pope John Paul II appointed Christian as the auxiliary bishop of Manchester and titular bishop of Quincy.  He was consecrated by Bishop Leo O’Neil on May 14, 1996 at the Cathedral of Saint Joseph in Manchester.In 2003, Christian was appointed pastor of St. Joseph the Worker Parish in Nashua, New Hampshire in addition to his duties as auxiliary bishop.

Retirement 
On February 1, 2018, Pope Francis accepted Christian's letter of resignation as auxiliary bishop of Manchester.  He continued to serve as pastor of St. Joseph the Worker Parish.

See also
 

 Catholic Church hierarchy
 Catholic Church in the United States
 Historical list of the Catholic bishops of the United States
 List of Catholic bishops of the United States
 Lists of patriarchs, archbishops, and bishops

References

External links
The Diocese of Manchester
Catholic Hierarchy

Episcopal succession

Living people
20th-century Roman Catholic bishops in the United States
21st-century Roman Catholic bishops in the United States
KU Leuven alumni
American College of the Immaculate Conception alumni
Roman Catholic Diocese of Manchester
Religious leaders from New Hampshire
People from Peterborough, New Hampshire
People from Jaffrey, New Hampshire
Catholics from New Hampshire
1942 births